Driving phobia, driving anxiety, vehophobia, or driving-related fear (DRF) is a pathological fear of driving. It is an intense, persistent fear of participating in car traffic (or in other vehicular transportation) that affects a person's lifestyle, including aspects such as an inability to participate in certain jobs due to the pathological avoidance of driving. The fear of driving may be triggered by specific driving situations, such as expressway driving or dense traffic. Driving anxiety can range from a mild cautious concern to a phobia.

Symptoms
The fear of driving is associated with various physical and subjective emotional symptoms that somewhat vary from individual to individual. For example, the physical symptoms might involve increased perspiration or tachycardia (pathologically accelerated heart rate), or hyperventilation. On the cognitive level, the patient may experience a loss of sense of reality, or thoughts of losing control while driving, even in situations that are reasonably safe. On a behavioral level, the avoidance of driving tends to perpetuate the phobia. Patients who developed their amaxophobia after a serious traffic accident frequently develop the post-traumatic stress disorder (PTSD) that may involve experiencing intrusive thoughts or anxious dreams of the original accident and/or other typical PTSD symptoms. 
A noteworthy part of post-accident symptomatology is the phantom brake syndrome. It is the passenger's partly involuntary or unintended pressing the foot on the floor of the car in a reflexive attempt "to brake." This unintended behavior usually occurs in skilled drivers when they are seated as a passenger next to a less competent person who drives the vehicle as a reflexive response to potentially dangerous traffic situations. The phantom brake syndrome is particularly common in survivors of serious car accidents.

Associated conditions
Some patients who present with phobia of driving also describe features consistent with various other anxiety disorders, including panic disorder, agoraphobia, specific phobia, and social phobia. The majority of survivors of serious car accidents tend to experience only the phobia of driving, but they often report generalized anxiety as a part of their post-traumatic adjustment disorder. The amaxophobia tends to be perpetuated by persistent pain caused by the car accident, and by pain related insomnia, and also by persistent post-conconcussion and whiplash symptoms caused by the accident. The PTSD symptoms, e.g., in the forms of flashbacks such as intrusive images of a bleeding person injured in the same car accident, may also contribute to amaxophobia.  Correlations of PTSD scores to scores on measures of driving anxiety are significant and range from .31 to .79.

Causes
There are three major categories of driving phobia, distinguished by their onset.

The most common cause of a fear of driving is traffic accidents. Thus, the amaxophobia often develops as a reaction to a particularly traumatic vehicular collision. Beck and Coffey reported that 25–33% of people involved in a car collision associated with injuries and related evaluation in a hospital experience subsequent fear of driving. Hickling and Blanchard and Kuch, Swinson, and Kirby found higher rates of driving phobia, ranging from 42% to 77%. The majority of experienced drivers with fear of driving in the aftermath of their serious accidents rate themselves as safer drivers than average, though they feel physically and emotionally too uncomfortable. For some patients, the fear escalates in very specific situations such as when near large vehicles (transport trucks, buses), but in others, the fear may be triggered already just by getting seated in the car or even just by thinking about having to again travel in a car in the near future. Several psychological questionnaires have been developed for clinicians to assess the situational intensity and facets of driving anxiety in novice drivers or also in experienced drivers traumatized by a recent car accident. Some novice drivers and passengers who were never involved in a serious car accident also report symptoms of amaxophobia. The driving fear may be, in some patients, an extension of agoraphobia.

Treatment 
The most common treatment for both driving phobia and milder forms of driving anxiety is behavior therapy in the form of systematic desensitization. An emerging treatment approach to treating amaxophobia is through the use of virtual reality therapy. With repeated exposure such as via devices similar to video games, the subjective distress is gradually reduced: the patient may subsequently be more willing to proceed to engaging in driving in real life situations, as the next stage of exposure therapy.

Psychological assessment 

Driving is a potentially dangerous activity. Almost every driver experiences some driving anxiety, in some situations, especially new drivers. Psychological assessment of novice drivers can proceed via questionnaires such as the Driving Behavior Survey (DBS) which consists of 20 items, each of which is rated on a scale from 1=never to 7=always, for example Item 4. "I have trouble staying in the correct lane," 5. "I drift into other lanes," 6. "I forget to make appropriate adjustments in speed." 
Lack of experience with driving or lack of driving skills in novice drivers obviously constitutes a different source of anxiety than the sudden traumatic event that generated post-accident anxiety of drivers who were adequately self-confident in cars until the collision. 
Another assessment tool designed for phobic fear in novice drivers is the Driving Cognition Questionnaire (DCQ). It also consists of 20 items. These are rated on a scale from 0=never to 4=always. Some items of this questionnaire assess related social anxieties and self-image issues, e.g., Item 8. "People will think I am a bad driver," 15. "I will hold up traffic and people will be angry," 17. "People will laugh at me," and 20. "I will lose control of myself and act stupidly or dangerously." Such self-image issues are relatively uncommon in patients with a post-accident amaxophobia some of whom drove without accidents and without emotional discomfort for decades.
The Driving and Riding Avoidance Scale (DRAS) also consists of 20 items. These are scored from 0="rarely or none of the time" to 4="Most or all of the time." Its 20 items describe various situations in which driving is avoided. As discussed by Taylor and Sullman, the wording of DRAS items allows for responses that are not necessarily based on fear of driving, but could also involve economic or practical issues. For instance, the travel via subway trains or streetcars within the center of some major North American or European cities is far more rapid than in cars and/or it saves both gasoline and parking fees.

Canadian psychotherapist James Whetstone has developed his Vehicle Anxiety Questionnaire to assess the driving phobia of survivors of car accidents. Whetstone's questionnaire is particularly suited for assessments of experienced but traumatized drivers and maps the driving phobia along 6 dimensions: (1) Compensating driving behaviours (Items 1 to 6), (2) Passenger anxieties (Items 7 to 10), (3) Physical manifestations of anxiety (Items 11 to 16), (4) Limitations to mobility (Items 17 to 21), (5) Avoidance behaviours (Items 22 to 26), and (6) Challenges to personal and relationship stability (Items 27 to 31).
The answers to Whetstone items can be scored with 0 points for "Not at All," 1 for "Mildly," 2 for "Frequently," and with 3 points for "Constantly." In clinical use, as the last part of Whetstone questionnaire, the patients are also asked to provide ratings, on a scale from 1 to 10, of anxiety as a driver or as a passenger since their accident and then, also separately the rating of their driver and passenger anxiety over the years before the accident.
In the criterion validation study, responses to Whetstone's questionnaire of 53 survivors of car accidents were compared to those of 24 normal controls. There was no overlap between the score distribution in the group of patients (lowest score was 23) and the control group (highest score was 19). The patients’ scores ranged from 23 to 93, with the average at 65.5 (SD=17.4) and those in a control group ranged from 0 to 19, with the average at 6.8 (SD=5.1). The convergent validity was also very satisfactory: high correlations were found of Whetstone questionnaire to the Driving Anxiety Questionnaire (r=.80) and to the PCL-5 measure of PTSD symptoms (r=.78). Whetstone scores were found to be also highly correlated with the post-concussion syndrome (r=.63) and moderately with whiplash symptoms (r=.46), post-accident insomnia (r=.56), ratings of post-accident pain (rs ranging from .43 to .50), and ratings of depression (r=.40) and of generalized anxiety (r=.43). Significant correlation was also found of Whetstone to Steiner's Automobile Anxiety Inventory (r=.45). Whetstone's article also provides the full text of the Driving Anxiety Questionnaire (DAQ) that consists of a list of driving situations that are rated by the patient on a scale from "No Anxiety" to "Severe Anxiety." This list consists of 14 situational items which the patient at first rates as a driver and then again separately as a passenger. The DAQ also includes 6 items describing behaviors indicative of anxiety as a driver and 7 items as a passenger. The study by Whetstone et al. reported also psychometric findings on the DAQ: its coefficients of convergent validity were satisfactory. The DAQ is especially well suited for behavior therapists for designing an individualized exposure therapy for each particular patient. A noteworthy part of this questionnaire is its measure of the phantom brake syndrome (the passenger's partly involuntary or unintended pressing the foot on the floor of the car in a reflexive attempt "to brake"; this reaction is common in skilled drivers who survived car accidents when travelling in the passenger seat). The article by Whetstone et al. also reviews the Automobile Anxiety Inventory (AAI) developed in Ontario by Leon Steiner. Steiner's AAI is a 23 item questionnaire of which 18 such are scored on a dichotomous basis (1=Yes, 0=No). Its convergent validity is adequate. Most of the AAI items compare the level of driving anxiety before the accident to the one after the accident. The AAI is written in relatively simple English. Steiner's AAI questionnaire is especially well suited for patients who read rarely or only reluctantly or for those with only elementary knowledge of written English. Since each of these 3 questionnaires (i.e., Whetstone's, Steiner's, and the DAQ) has a slightly different focus, it is often of advantage to use all 3 jointly in clinical assessments, as long as enough time is available.

Another psychological evaluation tool is the Gutierrez questionnaire developed by Jaime Gutierrez for assessments of patients after car accidents. A multifaceted assessment of driving anxiety is accomplished by using separately the items 54 to 65 of the Gutierrez questionnaire. Its items evaluate physical reactions, since accident, while again in cars, related feelings, behaviors such as avoidance of car trips or the phantom brake syndrome of drivers when travelling as a passenger (reflexive pressing the foot on the floor in situations subjectively perceived as potentially dangerous). 
The Gutierrez questionnaire also includes items listing various driving situations: the patient is to check those associated with anxiety. This provides useful data for systematic desensitization therapy of driving anxiety.

Epidemiology 

Little is known about the prevalence of driving anxiety. One study found that 16% of New Zealand adults have "moderate to severe driving anxiety".

See also 

 List of phobias

References

Driving
Phobias